Pireneitega pyrenaea is an araneomorph spider species found in Spain and France.

References

External links 

Agelenidae
Spiders of Europe
Spiders described in 1870